The Ramblin' Kid is a 1923 American silent Western film directed by Edward Sedgwick and featuring Hoot Gibson and Laura La Plante. This may be a lost film. It was based on the novel The Ramblin' Kid by Earl Wayland Bowman. The novel would later be filmed as a talkie in The Long Long Trail (1929) which also starred Gibson.

Plot

Cast
 Hoot Gibson as The Ramblin' Kid
 Laura La Plante as Carolyn June
 Harold Goodwin as Skinny Rawlins
 William Welsh as Lafe Dorsey
 W.T. McCulley as Sheriff Tom Poole
 Charles K. French as Joshua Heck
 G. Raymond Nye as Mike Sabota
 Carol Holloway as Mrs. Ophelia Cobb
 George King as Sing Pete

See also
 Hoot Gibson filmography

References

External links

 
 
 Press book for the film at emovieposter.com
 Bowman, Earl Wayland, The Ramblin' Kid, New York: Grosset & Dunlap, with stills from the 1923 film, on the Internet Archive

1923 films
1923 Western (genre) films
American black-and-white films
Films directed by Edward Sedgwick
Silent American Western (genre) films
Universal Pictures films
1920s American films
Films with screenplays by Richard Schayer
Films based on novels
1920s English-language films